Ploypailin Thangprabhaporn (4 March 1997) is a Thai actress, model, and YouTuber. Her nickname is Ploy and she was a younger sister of Pimprapa Tangprabhaporn the famous actress in Thailand.

Biography 
Ploypailin was born on 4 March 1997 at Bangkok, Thailand. She was a youngest child of Wichit Tangprabhaporn Managing Director of Bangkok Komatsu Sales Company Limited and his wife Sasikan. Ploypailin has 2 older sister is Pim Pimprapa and Prae.

Ploypailin graduated Bachelor's degree 1st class honor from College of Community Arts Rangsit University and got the degree certificate in 2019.

In 2016 Ploypailin had the signing contract with Channel 7 and was first on screen in Sitcom "Hor Hew Khon Hua Look" (หอเฮ้วขนหัวลุก) as Pla Thong (ปลาทอง) when she was 19 years old.

In 2017 Ploypailin has the first drama on period drama Massaya (มัสยา) as Reungjai Rattanamahasarn (เริงใจ รัตนมหาศาล) and then many roles on many dramas such as Look Long (ลูกหลง) Kluen Pee Paun (คลื่นผีป่วน) Nak Su Satan Fah (นักสู้สะท้านฟ้า) etc.

In 2020 Ploypailin has the first movie on Low Season (สุขสันต์วันโสด) as Lin (หลิน) with Mario Maurer and Ploypailin expired contract with Channel 7 in July–August 2020.

Filmography

TV Drama

Movies

Presenter

MC
 Online 
 2021 : On Air YouTube:Pigkaploy (17/11/21)

References

Citations

General references

External links 
 
 

1997 births
Living people
Ploypailin Thangprabhaporn
Ploypailin Thangprabhaporn
Ploypailin Thangprabhaporn
Ploypailin Thangprabhaporn
Ploypailin Thangprabhaporn
Ploypailin Thangprabhaporn
Ploypailin Thangprabhaporn